The 2013 Singapore Super Series was the sixth super series tournament of the 2013 BWF Super Series. The tournament was held in Singapore from 18–23 June 2013 and had a total purse of $200,000.

Men's singles

Seeds

  Du Pengyu
  Hu Yun
  Sony Dwi Kuncoro
  Kenichi Tago
  Boonsak Ponsana
  Nguyen Tien Minh
  Parupalli Kashyap
  Wang Zhengming

Top half

Bottom half

Finals

Women's singles

Seeds

  Li Xuerui
  Saina Nehwal
  Juliane Schenk
  Wang Yihan
  Ratchanok Inthanon
  Sung Ji-hyun
  Wang Shixian
  Minatsu Mitani

Top half

Bottom half

Finals

Men's doubles

Seeds

  Ko Sung-hyun / Lee Yong-dae
  Hiroyuki Endo / Kenichi Hayakawa
  Kim Ki-jung / Kim Sa-rang
  Liu Xiaolong / Qiu Zihan
  Cai Yun / Fu Haifeng
  Shin Baek-cheol / Yoo Yeon-seong
  Angga Pratama / Ryan Agung Saputra
  Goh V Shem / Lim Khim Wah

Top half

Bottom half

Finals

Women's doubles

Seeds

  Wang Xiaoli / Yu Yang
  Misaki Matsutomo / Ayaka Takahashi
  Ma Jin / Tang Jinhua
  Duanganong Aroonkesorn / Kunchala Voravichitchaikul
  Tian Qing / Zhao Yunlei
  Pia Zebadiah Bernadeth / Rizki Amelia Pradipta
  Bao Yixin / Cheng Shu
  Jung Kyung-eun / Kim Ha-na

Top half

Bottom half

Finals

Mixed doubles

Seeds

  Xu Chen / Ma Jin
  Zhang Nan / Zhao Yunlei
  Tantowi Ahmad / Lilyana Natsir
  Sudket Prapakamol / Saralee Thoungthongkam
  Muhammad Rijal / Debby Susanto
  Robert Mateusiak / Nadiezda Zieba
  Fran Kurniawan Teng / Shendy Puspa Irawati
  Markis Kido / Pia Zebadiah Bernadeth

Top half

Bottom half

Finals

References 

Singapore
Singapore Open (badminton)
Super Series